Jenny Craig, Inc., often known simply as Jenny Craig, is an American weight loss, weight management, and nutrition company. The company has more than 700 weight management centers in Australia, the United States, Canada, and New Zealand. The program combines individual weight management counseling with a menu of frozen meals and other foods which are distributed through its centers or shipped directly to clients.

History
Jenny Craig and her husband, Sidney Craig, founded Jenny Craig, Inc. in 1983 in Melbourne, Australia and began operations in the United States in 1985. The company expanded rapidly after entering the U.S., opening 46 locations by 1987 as well as 114 in other countries. In 1991, the company underwent an IPO, generating $73.5 million in funding.

In 1998 Jenny Craig was operating in Australia, New Zealand, Canada, Puerto Rico and US. The revenues had fallen from $401 million in 1996 to $352 million.

Throughout the 1990s, the company's share price declined as it ran into a series of financial troubles involving weight loss drugs, employee training, and costly leases before eventually being delisted from the New York Stock Exchange in August 2001. Jenny Craig stock then traded over the counter.

In 2002, Jenny Craig, Inc., was acquired by MidOcean Partners, a New York and London-based private equity investment firm, and ACI Capital, a New York-based private investment firm. On 19 June 2006, they announced the signing of a definitive agreement to sell the company to Nestlé in a transaction valued at approximately $600 million. The company was operated as part of Nestlé Nutrition. On 19 November 2013, Jenny Craig Inc. was purchased by North Castle Partners for an undisclosed amount. In April 2019, H.I.G. Capital acquired the Jenny Craig weight management business from North Castle Partners.

In 2008, YouTube personality Shane Dawson and approximately 6 other Jenny Craig employees including his mother and brother, were fired from their jobs for uploading a sketch to his YouTube channel. In 2013, Dawson wrote a comedy pilot about his experiences there and sold the script to NBC.

In March 2018, the company reportedly pulled its advertisements from The Ingraham Angle as a result of host Laura Ingraham cyberbullying David Hogg.

In 2019, H.I.G. Capital, a global private equity firm, acquired Jenny Craig for an undisclosed amount. In October 2019, Walgreens announced that it would begin offering Jenny Craig weight loss services at approximately 100 locations beginning in January 2020.

Diet effectiveness
According to a systematic review, overweight and obese adults enrolled in Jenny Craig after 12 months had 4.9% more weight loss than subjects in a control/education group (receiving no intervention, printed materials only, health education curriculum, or 3 sessions with a provider) or behavioral counseling group.

See also 
 List of diets

References

External links
 Jenny Craig official website

Companies based in Carlsbad, California
Brand name diet products
Weight loss companies
Australian companies established in 1983
2002 mergers and acquisitions
2006 mergers and acquisitions
2013 mergers and acquisitions